

The Fokker F.XXXVI (also known as the Fokker F.36) was a 1930s Dutch four-engined 32-passenger airliner designed and built by Fokker. It was the largest transport designed and built by Fokker.

Development
The Fokker F.XXXVI registered PH-AJA first flew on 22 June 1934 and was a high-wing cantilever monoplane with a fixed tailwheel landing gear. In Fokker tradition, the wing was an all wood structure and the fuselage was fabric covered steel tube. It was powered by four Wright Cyclone radial piston engines mounted in the wing leading edge, and carried 4 crew and 32 passengers in four eight-seat cabins. In an unusual decision, Fokker engineers went to great length in soundproofing the passenger cabin, enabling passenger to converse in a normal voice after take off. It was delivered to KLM and operated on European routes from March 1935. Although it had a good payload its range was much less than and was structurally inferior to (the maintenance advantages of all-metal aircraft were becoming clear) the new Douglas DC-2 and DC-3 and only one was built. KLM sold the aircraft in 1939 to Scottish Aviation for use as a crew and navigation trainer
for the Royal Air Forces No.12 Elementary Flying Training School, which was operated by Scottish Aviation. It was scrapped in 1940 after it burnt out in a take-off accident.

Airspeed Ltd. in Great Britain arranged a license to build F.XXXVIs for the British market as the Airspeed AS.20, but no orders were received.

Fokker F.37
In 1936, Fokker developed an improved version of the F.XXXVI, the F.37. It featured retractable landing gear with hydraulic suspension and  Wright GR-1820-G Cyclone engines. To save weight, the frame was to be made from chrome-molybdenum alloy tubing instead of steel and covered with fabric. Because of the higher takeoff weight, the wing spars and ribs were strengthened. The cockpit was redesigned to compete with the Douglas DC-2, and this allowed the pilots to sit next to each other. Fokker planned to build eight aircraft and deliver them between March and July 1937. However, KLM preferred all-metal aircraft, and instead it was the DC-3 that entered service and not the F.37.

Operators

Civil operators

KLM

Scottish Aviation

Military operators

Royal Air Force (operated by Scottish Aviation)

Specifications

References

Bibliography

R.de Leeuw, Fokker Commercial Aircraft. 1994, Fokker, The Hague
A.J. Jackson, British Civil Aircraft since 1919 Volume 2, 1974, Putnam, London, 
The Illustrated Encyclopedia of Aircraft (Part Work 1982-1985), 1985, Orbis Publishing, Page 1895/6
Taylor, H.A.. Airspeed Aircraft since 1931. Putnam. 1970. London. 

1930s Dutch airliners
F 36
Aircraft first flown in 1935
Abandoned civil aircraft projects
Four-engined tractor aircraft
Four-engined piston aircraft